The red-eared parrotfinch (Erythrura coloria) is a species of estrildid finch endemic to Mindanao in the Philippines.

Habitats
The species inhabits forest understorey and edge, second growth and grassy clearings at altitude over 1,000 m. The IUCN has classified the species as being of Least Concern.

Characteristics
The red-eared parrotfinch is probably present on every mountain in central Mindanao. It is a very unobtrusive and secretive bird. And its high-pitched call is easily overlooked. Its voice, however, is not uncommon at Kitanglad. Unlike the green-faced parrotfinch (E. viridifacies), it does not appear to be strongly dependent on bamboo, and is therefore less irruptive, unpredictable and vulnerable than that species.

References

External links
Species factsheet - BirdLife International

red-eared parrotfinch
Birds of Mindanao
red-eared parrotfinch